Vespa simillima, the yellow hornet, including the color form known as the , is a common hornet species in the Eastern Hemisphere. The typical mainland color form (Japanese:ケブカスズメバチ, Korean: 털보말벌, "hairy wasp") is darker and hairier than the yellow form; it lives in Hokkaido, the Korean Peninsula, Eastern Siberia and China, but is less common in Japan, where the yellow color form predominates. It should not be confused with the Asian giant hornet (Vespa mandarinia), which has a color form sometimes referred to as the "Japanese giant hornet". While there is a history of recognizing subspecies within many hornets, the most recent taxonomic revision treats all subspecific names in the genus Vespa as synonyms, effectively relegating them to no more than informal names for regional color forms.

Biology
Due to the large size of the swarm and aggressiveness of the yellow hornet, predation against them is rare. However, along with other insects in Japan and Korea, they are prey to the Asian giant hornet and nests have been known to be deserted after Asian giant hornet attacks, even though they attack in groups of only 10 to 30.

Nests of the yellow hornet are sometimes attacked by the parasitic species known as the black hornet (Vespa dybowskii). In the early stage of nesting, the black hornet queen attacks the queens of other hornets, including the yellow hornet and European hornet. If the assault succeeds, it will usurp the nest to produce its own offspring, assisted by the workers of the former owner.

The yellow hornet has the largest swarms of all of the hornet species, containing 1,000 to 2,000 workers. Although the yellow hornet is much smaller than the Asian giant hornet, it can be more dangerous to humans because they will attack people in greater numbers.

References

Hymenoptera of Asia
Insects of Japan
Vespidae
Insects described in 1868